Paradiskullen is a ski jumping hill in Örnsköldsvik, Sweden, and is also a local landmark as it can be seen from downtown Örnsköldsvik. It consists of a normal hill with a K-point of 90 and a hill size of 100, and nearby there are also a few smaller hills, one medium hill and three small hills, as part of the complex. The hill was originally built in 1961, and renovated in 1991 and 1992, but had to be moved slightly as the Bothnia Line railway line was being built. It is used by the local ski jumping club IF Friska Viljor and various international competitions have been held at the venue through the years, such as the FIS Ski Jumping World Cup, FIS Ski Jumping Continental Cup and FIS Cup.

External links 

Official site
Paradiskullen at skijumpinghills.com

Ski jumping venues in Sweden
Buildings and structures in Västernorrland County
Sport in Örnsköldsvik